Thomas Preston (1722) was a British officer, a captain who served in Boston in the Province of Massachusetts Bay. He commanded troops in the Boston Massacre in 1770 and was tried for murder, but he was acquitted. Historians have never settled whether he ordered his men to fire on the colonists. Preston was originally from Ireland; his people were among the Protestants settled there.

Boston Massacre
Preston was a captain of the 29th Regiment of Foot, part of the British garrison in Boston under the overall command of Thomas Gage. He was present at the Boston Massacre (known as the Incident on King Street by the British) on 5 March 1770, when British troops fired on colonists of the city, after an aggressive mob had confronted the troops and thrown snowballs, clubs, and rocks at them. Captain Thomas Preston showed up on the scene to help the other troops.

Charges were brought against him and other soldiers, but he was acquitted in a trial held in Boston, Massachusetts. Future United States President John Adams was his attorney. An eyewitness report by John Tudor, who was a merchant, says that Preston gave the order to fire, but many historians believe that he did not. Two of his men, Hugh Montgomery and Matthew Kilroy, were found guilty of manslaughter. They "prayed clergy" to avoid the death sentence. Instead, they were branded on the thumb with a hot iron, the letter "M" for murder. Captain Preston was tried separately. The main issue was whether or not he had called the order to fire, he was found not guilty.

After his trial, Preston retired from the army. He reportedly settled in Ireland. Adams later recalled seeing him in London in the 1780s, when Adams was serving there as US Minister to Britain.

In popular culture

 In the 2008 American miniseries, John Adams, Preston was played by British actor Ritchie Coster.
 In the 2015 History Channel miniseries, Sons of Liberty, Preston was portrayed by Shane Taylor.

Bibliography

 Hibbert, Christopher. Redcoats and Rebels: The American Revolution Through British Eyes. Avon Books, 1990.
 Zobel, Hiller (1234). The Boston Massacre. New York: W.W. Norton. ISBN 978-0-393-00606-3.
 "Boston Massacre Soldiers." West's Encyclopedia of American Law, edited by Shirelle Phelps and Jeffrey Lehman, 2nd ed., vol. 2, Gale, 2005, pp. 85–86. Gale In Context: U.S. History, link.gale.com/apps/doc/CX3437700593/UHIC?u=tel_a_pstcc&sid=bookmark-UHIC&xid=0bf9e4cb. Accessed 28 Feb. 2022.
 Tudor, John. "An Eyewitness Describes the Boston Massacre (1770)." The American Revolution, Primary Source Media, 1999. American Journey. Gale In Context: U.S. History, link.gale.com/apps/doc/EJ2153000060/UHIC?u=tel_a_pstcc&sid=bookmark-UHIC&xid=076c8cba. Accessed 28 Feb. 2022.
 Linder, Douglas. "The Boston Massacre Trials: An Account." Available at SSRN 1021327 (2007).
 Reid, John Phillip. "A Lawyer Acquitted: John Adams and the Boston Massacre Trials." The American Journal of Legal History 18.3 (1974): 189–207.
 ^ Reid, John Phillip. "A Lawyer Acquitted: John Adams and the Boston Massacre Trials." The American Journal of Legal History 18.3 (1974): 189–207.
 ^ Tudor, John. "An Eyewitness Describes the Boston Massacre (1770)." The American Revolution, Primary Source Media, 1999. American Journey. Gale In Context: U.S. History, link.gale.com/apps/doc/EJ2153000060/UHIC?u=tel_a_pstcc&sid=bookmark-UHIC&xid=076c8cba. Accessed 28 Feb. 2022.
 ^ "Boston Massacre Soldiers." West's Encyclopedia of American Law, edited by Shirelle Phelps and Jeffrey Lehman, 2nd ed., vol. 2, Gale, 2005, pp. 85–86. Gale In Context: U.S. History, link.gale.com/apps/doc/CX3437700593/UHIC?u=tel_a_pstcc&sid=bookmark-UHIC&xid=0bf9e4cb. Accessed 28 Feb. 2022.
 ^ Linder, Douglas. "The Boston Massacre Trials: An Account." Available at SSRN 1021327 (2007).

References

Year of birth uncertain
18th-century deaths
29th Regiment of Foot officers
Worcestershire Regiment officers
People acquitted of murder
Irish officers in the British Army
Boston Massacre
18th-century Irish people